The 1999 Jade Solid Gold Best Ten Music Awards Presentation was held in January 2000. It is part of the Jade Solid Gold Best Ten Music Awards Presentation series held in Hong Kong.

Top 10 song awards
The top 10 songs (十大勁歌金曲) of 1999 are as follows.

Additional awards

References
 Top ten songs award 1999, Tvcity.tvb.com
 Additional awards 1999, Tvcity.tvb.com

Jade Solid Gold Best Ten Music Awards Presentation, 1999